Moose Basin Divide is a pedestrian mountain pass located in the Teton Range, Grand Teton National Park, in the U.S. state of Wyoming. From Wilcox Point on Jackson Lake, Moose Basin Divide is a  one way trip by way of the Webb Canyon Trail. The divide is located in a less visited region of the park and the trails cross streams that do not have foot bridges.

References

Mountain passes of Wyoming
Mountain passes of Teton County, Wyoming